Martyr Mustafa Special Sports Complex is an indoor multi-purpose sport venue that is located in the Yenibosna, Bahçelievler, Istanbul, Turkey. The hall, with a capacity for 2,100 spectators, was built in 2015.

History
In the statement made on 27 September 2021, Galatasaray Women's Basketball Team announced that they will play their games in the Women's Basketball Super League and EuroLeague Women in this hall in the 2021–22 season.

References

Sports venues completed in 2015
Indoor arenas in Turkey
Basketball venues in Turkey
Turkish Basketball League venues